In general topology, a polytopological space consists of a set  together with a family  of topologies on  that is linearly ordered by the inclusion relation ( is an arbitrary index set). It is usually assumed that the topologies are in non-decreasing order, but some authors prefer to put the associated closure operators  in non-decreasing order (operators  and  satisfy  if and only if  for all ), in which case the topologies have to be non-increasing.

Polytopological spaces were introduced in 2008 by the philosopher Thomas Icard for the purpose of defining a topological model of Japaridze's polymodal logic (GLP). They subsequently became an object of study in their own right, specifically in connection with Kuratowski's closure-complement problem.

Definition 

An -topological space 
is a set  together with a monotone map  Top where  is a partially ordered set and Top is the set of all possible topologies on  ordered by inclusion. When the partial order  is a linear order, then  is called a polytopological space. Taking  to be the ordinal number  an [[N-topological space|-topological space]]  can be thought of as a set  together with  topologies  on it (or  depending on preference).  More generally, a multitopological space  is a set  together with an arbitrary family  of topologies on

See also
 Bitopological space

References 

Topology